Mr. T. W. Anthony Woo is a 1951 picture book written and illustrated by Marie Hall Ets. Normally enemies a cat, dog, and mouse team-up to rid their house of a woman and her parrot. The book was a recipient of a 1952 Caldecott Honor for its illustrations.

References

1951 children's books
American picture books
Caldecott Honor-winning works